The two-section staff or changxiaobang is a versatile weapon which originated in China from the ancient Shaolin temple and Shaolin martial arts. It is a flail-type weapon which consists of a long staff with a shorter rod attached by a chain, to serve as a cudgel.

See also
Flail (weapon)
Hung Ga
Kung fu
Northern Shaolin
Nunchaku
Pyeongon
Shaolin Kung Fu
Southern Shaolin
Three-section staff
Wushu (sport)

References

Chinese melee weapons
Flail weapons
Polearms